Vanuatu has competed at every edition of the IAAF World Athletics Championships since its inception in 1983. Its competing country code is VAN. The country has not won any medals at the competition and as of 2017 no Vanuatuan athlete has progressed beyond the first round of an event.

2009
Vanuatu competed at the 2009 World Championships in Athletics from 15–23 August. A team of 2 athletes was announced in preparation for the competition.

2011
Vanuatu competed at the 2011 World Championships in Athletics from August 27 to September 4 in Daegu, South Korea. A team of 2 athletes was announced to represent the country
in the event.

2013
Vanuatu competed at the 2013 World Championships in Athletics in Moscow, Russia, from 10–18 August 2013. A team of one athlete was announced to represent the country in the event.

2015
Vanuatu competed at the 2015 World Championships in Athletics in Beijing, China, from 22–30 August 2015.

2017
Vanuatu will compete at the 2017 World Championships in Athletics in London, Great Britain, from 4–13 August 2017.

2019

Vanuatu will compete at the 2019 World Championships in Athletics in Doha, Qatar, from 27 September 2019.

References 

 
Vanuatu
World Championships in Athletics